Jiří Šťastný (born 13 December 1938) is a Czech basketball player. He competed in the men's tournament at the 1960 Summer Olympics.

References

1938 births
Living people
Czech men's basketball players
Olympic basketball players of Czechoslovakia
Basketball players at the 1960 Summer Olympics
Sportspeople from Prague